Blue Lights in the Basement is the sixth studio album by American singer Roberta Flack released by Atlantic on December 13, 1977. The album was a commercial success, peaking at number eight on the US Billboard 200, becoming her third top-ten album on the chart and reaching number five on the R&B albums chart. On February 27, 1978, the album received a Gold certification by the Recording Industry Association of America (RIAA) for shipments over 500,000 copies.

The album features the single "The Closer I Get to You", a duet with best friend and fellow soul musician Donny Hathaway, which became the biggest hit from the album, peaking at #2 on the Billboard Hot 100, and reaching #1 on the Hot Soul Singles chart. The collaboration with Hathaway would be one of his final singles released in his lifetime before his death in 1979.

The Blue Lights in the Basement track "After You" (a song released originally by Diana Ross in 1976) would be the first of several Michael Masser compositions Flack would record (with the 1983 Peabo Bryson duet "Tonight, I Celebrate My Love" becoming a million-seller): in 2008 Flack would cite "After You" as one of her favorite recordings.

Track listing

Personnel 
 Roberta Flack – lead vocals, backing vocals, keyboards, arrangements
 Paul Griffin – keyboards
 Ronnie Foster – keyboards, synthesizers, backing vocals
 Don Grolnick – keyboards
 Rob Mounsey – keyboards
 Leon Pendarvis – keyboards, backing vocals, musical arrangements
 Harry Whitaker – keyboards, musical arrangements
 Reggie Lucas – guitar
 Hugh McCracken – guitar, musical arrangements
 Jeff Mironov – guitar
 David Spinozza – guitar
 John Tropea – guitar
 Anthony Jackson – electric bass
 Basil Fearrington – electric bass
 Will Lee – electric bass
 Gary King – electric bass, musical arrangements
 Steve Gadd – drums
 Allan Schwartzberg – drums
 Jimmy Wong – drums
 Howard King – drums
 Idris Muhammad – drums
 Errol "Crusher" Bennett – percussion
 David Carey – percussion
 Jimmy Maelen – percussion
 James Mtume – percussion, backing vocals
 Michael Kamen – oboe solo (10), musical arrangements
 Donny Hathaway – lead vocals (2)
 Jim Gilstrap – backing vocals
 Lani Groves – backing vocals
 Gwen Guthrie – backing vocals
 Yvonne Lewis – backing vocals
 Gene McDaniels – backing vocals
 Zach Sanders – backing vocals
 Brenda White – backing vocals
 Deniece Williams – backing vocals

Production 
 Joe Ferla – producer, engineer, remixing 
 Rubina Flake – producer
 Gene McDaniels – producer
 Ahmet Ertegun – executive producer 
 Brian Christian – engineer 
 Mike Moran – engineer
 Ralph Moss – engineer
 Phil Schier – engineer
 Ted Spencer – engineer
 Jack Adelman – mastering 
 Stewart Bosley – album design 
 Gazebo Group – album design 
 Dave Gahr – back photography 
 John Pinderhughes – front photography

Studios 
 Recorded at The Hit Factory, Columbia Recording Studios, RCA Studios and Record Plant N.Y.C. (New York, NY); Record Plant and Westlake Audio (Los Angeles, CA); Kendun Recorders (Burbank, CA); P.S. Recording Studios (Chicago, IL).

Charts and certifications

Certifications

References

External links

Roberta Flack albums
1977 albums
Atlantic Records albums